HMS Kangaroo was a  torpedo boat destroyer of the British Royal Navy. She served with the Dover Patrol in the First World War.

Construction and design
Kangaroo was laid down by Palmers Shipbuilding and Iron Company at Jarrow-on-Tyne as Yard Number 787 on 29 December 1899 with work starting on speculation (i.e. without a specific order), but was purchased for the Royal Navy as part of the 1900–1901 shipbuilding programme. She was launched on 8 September 1900 and completed in July 1901.

Like these ships, she was powered by triple-expansion steam engines fed by four Reed boilers and driving two propeller shafts. Four funnels were fitted, with the two middle funnels very closely spaced.

Gun armament consisted of a single QF 12-pounder 12 cwt ( calibre) gun forward on a platform on the ship's conning tower together with five 6-pounder guns. Two 18-inch (450 mm) torpedo tubes completed the ship's armament.

Service
Kangaroo was commissioned in August 1901 by Lieutenant Charles Edward Whately Pyddoke for service on the Mediterranean Station. She visited Lemnos in August 1902, and the following month was part of a squadron visiting Nauplia and Souda Bay at Crete. She returned to the United Kingdom in 1905. Apart from this tour in the Mediterranean,  Kangaroo spent most of her duty time in home waters. In 1906 Kangaroo was part of the First Destroyer Division. She was part of the Fourth Destroyer Flotilla at Portsmouth between 1910 and 1912, and then joined the Sixth Destroyer Flotilla.

Kangaroo remained part of the Sixth Destroyer Flotilla, based at Dover for the duration of the First World War.

HMS Kangaroo was finally sold for scrap to M. Yates on 23 February 1920, but was resold to Thos. W. Ward and broken up at Milford Haven.

Pennant numbers

Notes

Citations

Bibliography
 
 
 
 
 
 
 
 

 

Ships built on the River Tyne
1900 ships
B-class destroyers (1913)
World War I destroyers of the United Kingdom